Joe T. Ford is a former Chief Executive Officer and co-founder of Alltel, a global communications company.

Joe T. Ford graduated from the University of Arkansas in 1959 with a Bachelor of Science in Business Administration.  While attending Arkansas, he was a member of the Pi Kappa Alpha Fraternity.

Ford went to work for Allied Telephone Company upon his graduation from college.  Allied subsequently merged with Mid-Continent Telephone Corporation in 1983.  The name of the newly expanded corporation was changed to Alltel, and Mr. Ford became its first President.  Ford was promoted to CEO in 1987, and eventually became Chairman of the Board in 1991.

Under his leadership, Allied (now Alltel) grew from a predominantly rural Arkansas-based land line telephone company to a telecommunications giant with over 15 million customers and $10 billion in annual revenue.

Ford is the Vice Chairman of Augusta National Golf Club, and a co-founder of Westrock Coffee Company.

References

Joe T Ford Chairman of the Board/Director at Alltel Corporation at forbes.com
Westrock Coffee  at Business Week

Living people
Year of birth missing (living people)
University of Arkansas alumni